The Hong Kong Film Award for Best Original Film Song is an award presented annually at the Hong Kong Film Awards for a film with the best original song. As of 2016 the current winner is  She Remembers, He Forgets with Day Tai composing, Saville Chan for lyrics and Feanna Wong singing.

Winners and nominees

References

External links
 Hong Kong Film Awards Official Site

Hong Kong Film Awards